The 2023 season is Lion City Sailors Women's 2nd consecutive season in the top flight of Singapore football and in the Singapore Premier League.

Squad

Women squad (LCS)

Women squad (Mattar Sailors)

Coaching staff 
The following list displays the coaching staff of all the Lion City Sailors current football sections:

First Team

 Academy

Transfers

In 
Pre-season

Out 

Pre-season

Loan Returns 
Pre-season

Mid-season

Loans Out 
Pre-season

Mid-Season

Contract extensions

Friendlies

Pre-season friendlies

Team statistics

Appearances and goals (Women)

Competition (Women's Premier League)

Women's Premier League

League table

See also 
 2010 Home United FC season
 2011 Home United FC season
 2012 Home United FC season
 2013 Home United FC season
 2014 Home United FC season
 2015 Home United FC season
 2016 Home United FC season
 2017 Home United FC season
 2018 Home United FC season
 2019 Home United FC season
 2020 Lion City Sailors FC season
 2021 Lion City Sailors F.C. season
 2022 Lion City Sailors F.C. season
 2023 Lion City Sailors Women

Notes

References 

Lion City Sailors F.C.
Lion City Sailors FC seasons
2023
1